A , or , is the German term for a narrow-gauge field railway, usually not open to the public, which in its simplest form provides for the transportation of agricultural, forestry and industrial raw materials such as wood, peat, stone, earth and sand.

Military use

During the First World War, the enormous logistical demands of trench warfare led to the development of military narrow-gauge railway or  networks, also referred to as trench railways. Throughout World War I, the British and French also used trench railways, called War Department Light Railways and Decauville Railways respectively. However, the German approach was less improvised and more permanent. With each successful advance, the British and French forces faced ever lengthening supply lines, while the Germans retreated deeper towards their homeland. After the war, much remaining trackage and rolling stock was put to use in more conventional narrow-gauge applications throughout Europe.

General use 

In the processing industry, these narrow-gauge railways once held an important role. As a result, Feldbahnen were frequently associated with refractory clay factories, brickyards, sugar factories and iron and steel mills. They were also used for pulling canal barges, transporting military materiel and personnel and removing materials from large-scale building sites and the rubble from ruined cities after the Second World War.

The track (rails and sleepers) utilised, ranged from light, rail frames that could be carried and laid by two men and were often laid directly on the ground with no trackbed, to properly laid, ballasted lines for heavy loads and extended use.  Tight curves enabled lines to be more easily routed, largely without structures being required, even in difficult terrain. Provisional track laid along the edges of ditches as they were being extended forward, often on soft ground, led occasionally to derailments. As a result, on many , wooden planks and other lifting gear were carried. Turntables were usually operated by hand.

Simple and robust vehicles characterised everyday operations. Locomotives were not always available, so it was quite common for individual wagons - even when loaded - to be moved with horses or by human muscle power alone. In tight spaces or where access was difficult, the help of children and youngsters was enlisted to haul tipper wagons.

Frequently rolling stock was hand-built or was manufactured to order in small batches. Usually no signals were installed, the low speeds enabling trains to be driven by sight. At level crossings on larger roads, temporary bells or light signals were installed, that enabled trains to cross safely.

In the depot at Laboe type S 14 rail profiles were laid and later changed to new S 20 rails . One type DS 60 locomotive and 18 DIEMA DS 90 locomotives were used. The railway stock there also included a fire fighting train, a snow blower and even a rotary snow plough. Three seated coaches were available for the transport of personnel. The line at Aurich depot was closed in 1982 and last operations in Laboe took place in 1993. Finally, in December 1996, the Laboe railway was closed. A DS 90 locomotive, no. 9, is still in the depot at Laboe as a memorial.

Today's situation 

The use of  declined dramatically in the late 20th century, as their tasks have been taken on by lorries and  electrically driven conveyor belts. They are now used only where the ground conditions (e.g. moorland or peat bogs) or lack of space (mining) render the routine use of other means impractical. The  is still widely used in Germany in industrial peat extraction, especially in Lower Saxony and Schleswig-Holstein. In addition they are still used occasionally in brickworks and other industrial premises. As a result, increasing numbers of museums and societies dedicate themselves to the protection of historical  railways. This includes efforts in many places to restore closed  again and to give them new life as museum railways.

Feldbahn museums and working lines

Germany

Baden-Württemberg 

 Bad Wurzach
 Buchen
 Mannheim Technoseum
 Neckarbischofsheim
 Spiegelberg
 Wiesloch Feldbahn and Industrial Museum

Bavaria 
 Fürstenfeldbruck: Fürstenfeldbruck Model Railway Club
 Hengersberg
 Nuremberg: Feldbahn-Museum 500
 Rottau am Chiemsee: Bavarian Moor and Peat Museum
 Sankt Oswald-Riedlhütte: Riedlhütte Feldbahn and Waldbahn, Length: 1 km
 Petersaurach/Rügland (Ansbach district): Franconian Feldbahn Museum

Berlin 

 Berlin – FEZ Wuhlheide:  Feldbahn project at FEZ Wuhlheide
 Berlin – Britzer Garten:  museum railway (built from Feldbahn components on the former BUGA site, several vehicles are replicas of historic prototypes)

Brandenburg 
 Mildenberg: Mildenberg Brickworks Park, 2 clay tipper railways, 500 and 630 mm

Hesse 
 Frankfurt am Main: Frankfurt Feldbahn Museum
 Eichenberg: Eichenberger Waldbahn
 Bad Schwalbacher Kurbahn
 Solms–Oberbiel: Feldbahn and Fortuna Pit Railway Museum
 Bad Orber Light Railway: reactivated in 2002 with a Feldbahn track

Mecklenburg-Vorpommern 
 Alt Schwerin: Historical Agriculture Museum
 Bad Sülze: salt museum, peat railway

Lower Saxony 

 Baltrum: island railway for luggage transportation, 1949–1985
 Burgsittensen: Burgsittensen Moor Railway
 Deinste: German Feldbahn and Kleinbahn Museum
 Diepenau: Uchter Moor Railway
 Drochtersen–Aschhorn: Moorkieker Moor Railway
 Essern: Essern Moor Railway
 Fredenbeck-Wedel: Wedel Feldbahn
 Freistatt–Heimstatt: deaconry
 Flögeln: Ahlenmoor Moor Railway
 Goldenstedt-Arkeburg: Nature information centre
 Groß-Hesepe: Emsland Moor Museum
 Hildesheim: Hildesheim Feldbahn Museum
 Minsener Oog – Minsener Oog Coastal Defence Railway (Lorenbahn for light goods traffic)
 Neustadt am Rübenberge
 Ostercappeln-Hitzhausen: museum for narrow-gauge industrial railways
 Sassenburg-Westerbeck: moor railway and Euflor Peat Works (part of the moor nature trail at www.moorlehrpfad.de)
 Saterland–Ramsloh: moor railway services, Koch Peat Works
 Wiesmoor: Peat and Settlers Museum

North Rhine-Westphalia 

 Lengerich Lengerich Railway Society
 Lage: Feldbahn in the WIM »Lage Brickworks«
 Oekoven: Feldbahn museum
 Witten-Bommern: Theresia Mine Pit and Feldbahn Museum
 Bochum-Dahlhausen Railway Museum
 Schermbeck-Gahlen Feldbahn
 Eslohe Mechanical and Local History Museum

Rhineland-Palatinate 

 Bad Ems: Pit railway in the Ems Mining Museum
 Guldental
 Ramsen (Pfalz): Waldbahn stub line
 Serrig: estate
 Sondernheim: brickyard museum (Ziegeleimuseum Sondernheim)

Saxony 

 Chemnitz: Feldbahn in the Saxon Railway Museum
 Glossen bei Oschatz: Feldbahn viewing point
 Leipzig-Lindenau: Museum Feldbahn, 
 Lindenau (Radebeul): Radebeul-Lindenau sawmill Feldbahn Löbau: Werner‘s Garden Railway
 Lohmen: Herrenleite Feldbahn Museum, Dresden Historic Feldbahn
 Niederwürschnitz (bei Chemnitz): "Old Brickworks" Feldbahn

 Saxony-Anhalt 
 Elbingerode: pit railway
 Bennstedt: Feldbahn under construction
 Schlanstedt: Schlanstedt Historic Feldbahn
 Bad Dürrenberg: 1836 opening of the Tollwitz–Dürrenberger Feldbahn (4.5 km) with the first German railway tunnel (133 m)

 Schleswig-Holstein 
 Aumühle near Hamburg:  Feldbahn on the terrain of the VVM
 Bad Bramstedt
 Bad Malente Gremsmühlen
 Neritz-Flogensee, chicken farm, length 300 m
 Tolk-Schau in Tolk near Schleswig (Stadt)
 Nordstrandischmoor island: Lüttmoorsiel-Nordstrandischmoor island railway
 The line to the halligs of Oland and Langeneß are built to a  gauge which is uncommon amongst Feldbahnen. (however the definition of a Feldbahn is not a question of gauge, but rather of purpose and operation.)
 Buchhorster Waldbahn, as museum railway operated remaining line of the former brickworks and matchworks near Lauenburg an der Elbe.

 Thuringia 

 Ilfeld – Netzkater: pit railway
 Ilmenau: in the Volle Rose Show Mine
 Lichtenhain: Waldeisenbahn
 Trusetal: Hühn Pit – pit railway

 Austria 
 Lower Austria: Freiland in Türnitz, Feldbahn and industrial railway museum
 Lower Austria: Schwarzau im Gebirge, Rotte Naßwald: Naßwald Waldbahn (closed in 2008)
 Lower Austria: Schwechat, Schwechat Railway Museum
 Upper Austria: Wels, Scholz Feldbahn 
 Vienna: Geriatriezentrum Am Wienerwald Feldbahn (closed 2011)
 Salzburg: Diabasbahn Saalfelden (closed in 2008 and replaced by a standard-gauge line)
 Salzburg: Großgmain Museum Feldbahn (rebuilt in 2009)

 Austria/Switzerland 
 Lustenau: International Rhine Control Railway (Bahn der internationalen Rheinregulierung)

 Switzerland 

 Schinznach-Dorf: Schinznach Nursery Railway (www.schbb.ch)
 Otelfingen: Swiss Feldbahn and Werkbahn Society

 Belgium 
 Pairi Daiza zoo passenger steam train.

 Czech Republic 
 Kolínská řepařská drážka: sugar beet line (Rübenbahn)

 Norway 
 Kristiansand Kanonmuseum. Former ammunition railroad to Marinenküstenbatterie 6./502 "Vara'" (Norwegian name: Mövik fort). Built around 1941-1942, partially decommissioned around 1960. Restored back to running order in June 2016.

See also 

Decauville
Forest railway
Heeresfeldbahn – German and Austrian military field railways
History of rail transport in Germany
Light railway
War Department Light Railways

References

Further reading 
  (Die schmalspurigen Industriebahnen und ihre Fahrzeuge)
 
  (Feldbahnbetriebe in Deutschland)
  (Feldbahnbetriebe in Österreich)
  (Feldbahnbetriebe in der ehemaligen DDR)
  (Industriebetriebe, Sammlungen, Denkmäler)
  (Feldbahnen in Bad Langensalza, Erfurt-Gispersleben, Gotha, Höngeda/Seebach, Laucha, Straussfurt und Stregda)
 

Military railways
Narrow gauge railways
Narrow gauge railways in Germany
Railways by type